The Nilganj River is a river in Bangladesh. It is one of the major rivers of Kalapara Upazila in Patuakhali District and flows into the Andharmanik River.

References

Rivers of Bangladesh
Rivers of Barisal Division